Mathilda Lindholm (born 17 July 1995) is a Finnish badminton player, specializing in doubles play. She started playing badminton at 5 years old, then in 2005, she joined Finnish national badminton team.

In 2011, she won gold medal at the European U17 Badminton Championships in mixed doubles event with Iikka Heino. She also finished as runner-up in senior level at the 2010 Finnish Open and 2015 Hellas International in women's doubles event with Jenny Nyström. She participated at the 2015 European Games in Baku, Azerbaijan.

Achievements

BWF International Challenge/Series 
Women's doubles

  BWF International Challenge tournament
  BWF International Series tournament
  BWF Future Series tournament

References

External links 
 

1995 births
Living people
Sportspeople from Stockholm
Finnish female badminton players
Badminton players at the 2015 European Games
European Games competitors for Finland